Bondone may refer to:

 Bondone, commune in Trentino, Italy
 Monte Bondone, mountain in Trentino, Italy
 Giotto di Bondone (1270-1337), Italian painter